Oshnavieh-ye Shomali Rural District is in the Central District of Oshnavieh County, West Azerbaijan province, Iran. At the National Census of 2006, its population was 10,315 in 1,940 households. There were 12,204 inhabitants in 3,155 households at the following census of 2011. At the most recent census of 2016, the population of the rural district was 8,649 in 2,195 households. The largest of its 26 villages was Nalivan, with 1,186 people.

References 

Oshnavieh County

Rural Districts of West Azerbaijan Province

Populated places in West Azerbaijan Province

Populated places in Oshnavieh County